José Daniel Betances, known professionally as Amenazzy, or sometimes El Nene La Amenaza, is a Dominican urban music singer from Santiago de los Caballeros.

Biography 
Amenazzy was born in Santiago, Dominican Republic in 1995, and began singing at an early age. He was featured on a 2013 single by Los Mellos on the Track. After several more guest appearances, he had a solo hit single in 2015 with "La Chanty", and his self-titled album was released in 2016.

Amanazzy has been praised for his combination of reggaeton and R&B music. He has collaborated with artists such as El Alfa, Bryant Myers, G-Eazy, Farruko, Don Omar, De La Ghetto, Izzy La Reina, Myke Towers, Yandel and Nicky Jam. His song "Baby" with Nicky Jam and Farruko garnered over 300 million views on YouTube.

References 

1995 births
Living people
21st-century Dominican Republic male singers